Wenatchee (YTB-808) was a United States Navy  named for Wenatchee, Washington.

Construction
The contract for Wenatchee was awarded 4 March 1969. She was laid down on 24 November 1969 at Sturgeon Bay, Wisconsin, by Peterson Builders and launched 7 July 1970.

Operational history
Placed in service on Christmas Day 1970, Wenatchee was assigned to the 11th Naval District and, since going into service, has operated at San Diego, Calif.

Sometime prior to December 2005, Wenatchee was reassigned to Bremerton, Washington.

Stricken from the Navy List 27 September 2011 and sold for commercial use 2013.

References

External links
 

 

Natick-class large harbor tugs
1970 ships
Ships built by Peterson Builders